State Trunk Highway 181 (often called Highway 181, STH-181 or WIS 181) is a  state highway in Milwaukee and Ozaukee counties in Wisconsin, United States, that runs north–south in southeast Wisconsin from West Allis to Cedarburg.

Route description

WIS 181 begins at WIS 59 in West Allis near the Wisconsin State Fairgrounds as 84th Street. After passing by the fairgrounds, 84th Street crosses under I-94 and becomes Glenview Avenue. Prior to entering Wauwatosa, the route intersects U.S. 18 and exits the downtown area as 76th Street. WIS 190 and WIS 175 are intersected prior to WIS 181 crossing over WIS 145 and Silver Springs Drive. Before leaving Ozaukee County, WIS 181 crosses over WIS 100 and enters Ozaukee County in Mequon. The only major intersection prior to ending at WIS 60 near Cedarburg is at the intersection of WIS 167 in Mequon.

Major intersections

See also

References

External links

181
Transportation in Milwaukee County, Wisconsin
Transportation in Ozaukee County, Wisconsin